David Roberts  (1831–1884) was a British poet known as ‘Dewi Havhesp’.

Profession
David Roberts was a successful tailor with a comfortable income. His family were wealthy landowners and obtained revenue from numerous farms and land. Roberts eventually died in penury at the workhouse at Bala.

Life 
Born to a well known bardic family in May 1831 he spent his early years at 'Pensingrug' Llanfor, Bala, North Wales. He was the eldest of the eleven children of Robert and Margaret Evans, and through his mother, who was a granddaughter of William Edwards, he was related to the poet Robert Williams.
He took his 'bardic name' Havhesp from the name of a stream near his boyhood home. He produced enough written poetry in the Welsh language to produce a book. The book Oriau'r Awen meaning Hours of Muse was first published in 1877, the most recent (3rd edition) was published in 1927. Much of his work was oral and therefore unrecorded. He died in August 1884 and is buried at Llandderfel in North Wales.

Works 
 Oriau 'r Awen gan Dewi Havhesp, published in Bala 1877
 Oriau 'r Awen gan Dewi Havhesp, reprinted in Bala 1927 with a personal history of the bard as an introduction.

References 

1831 births
1884 deaths
Welsh poets
19th-century poets